Casteltermini is a comune (municipality) in the Province of Agrigento in the Italian region Sicily, located about  southeast of Palermo and about  north of Agrigento.

Casteltermini borders the following municipalities: Acquaviva Platani, Aragona, Cammarata, Campofranco, San Biagio Platani, Sant'Angelo Muxaro, Santo Stefano Quisquina, Sutera.

History 
Casteltermini was founded in 1629 by the local noble Gian Vincenzo Maria Termini e Ferreri, hence the name.

Casteltermini is noted for its extensive mines of rock salt and sulphur.

Main sights 

Chiesa Madre - "Mother Church"
Church of San Giuseppe
Hermitage of Santa Croce
Church of Madonna del Carmelo
Church of Jesus and Mary 
Antiquarium
Ethnographic Museum
Memorial of World War I and II Veterans, located in the city center in front of the Chiesa Madre. The names on the upper half represent the veterans of World War I. The names listed on the lower half represent the names of veterans from WW2.

Twin towns
 Châtelet, Belgium

Notable people
 Niccolò Cacciatore (1770-1841), astronomer
 Michele Caltagirone (1854-1928), sculptor

References

External links 
 Official website

Cities and towns in Sicily